Yenidoğan (also known as Asi) is a village in the Kozluk District of Batman Province in Turkey. The village is populated by Arabs and had a population of 487 in 2021.

The hamlets of Alacalar, Budak, İkizce, Örmeli, Seyrantepe and Tepecik are attached to the village.

References 

Villages in Kozluk District
Arab settlements in Batman Province